Erich Gleixner (1 April 1920 – 22 January 1962) was a German footballer who competed in the 1952 Summer Olympics.

References

1920 births
1962 deaths
German footballers
Association football forwards
Olympic footballers of Germany
Footballers at the 1952 Summer Olympics
German footballers needing infoboxes